Shahram Alidi (born 11 December 1971, Sanandaj, Kurdistan, Iran) is an Iranian film director, screenwriter, and film producer. He is also a painter, illustrator, and graphic designer. Alidi is part of a generation of filmmakers in the Iranian New Wave. These filmmakers share many common techniques including the use of poetic dialogue and allegorical story telling. His credits include the 2009 film Whisper with the wind.

Background
Alidi's first artistic experience was as an actor in school theaters. Later he started painting that continued into his late teens, winning many first prizes in the National Arts Competitions before he started studying Painting at Tehran University, Faculty of Fine Arts. Later he graduated in M.A. in Animation Directing in Art University, Cinema and Theater Faculty. He has worked extensively as graphic designer, interior designer, illustrator for children books, Stage designer in theater and cinema, title designer during 1994–7.

Filmography
Long Feature Film:
2015: Black Horse Memories – Feature – H.D – 90 min
2009: Whisper with the Wind – Feature – 35mm – 77 min
Short Films:
2010: Ode of Mirror – Poetic Fiction – H.D – 12 min
2009: A Rosary – Poetic Fiction – H.D – 10 min
2008: Quatrain of Water – Poetic Fiction – H.D – 12 min
2006: Mountains of Tehran – Documentary – D.V – 20 min
2005: The Breath – Documentary – D.V – 20 min
2003: Dreamless village – Fiction- D.V – 20 min
2003: Button (Dokme)- Fiction- D.V – 13 min
2003: The last uncounted village – Fiction – D.V – 15 min
2000: The Ground is hard, the sky is far – Fiction – Beta cam – 20 min
1999: The Heavenly doors – Documentary – Beta – 15 min
1998: Milk (Shote) – Fiction – Beta – 30 min
1997: Mamli – Fiction/Documentary – 16 mm – 20 min

Events
Awards for "Whisper with the Wind":
2010: Tromso Film Festival / Golden Don Quixote /Norway
2009: Bratislava Film Festival / Young Academic Student Jury Prize /Slovakia, Pessac International Historic Film Festival/ Prize of Academic Jury/France, Amazon Film Festival / Special Jury Award/Brazil, Mumbai International Film Festival/Prize of Mumbai Young Critics Award/India.
'Cannes' International Film Festival/France/Critic Weeks Section/ Competitor for Golden Camera:
The Best Feature Film's ACID support
Prize of View of Youth
Prize of Young European Critics

Awards of "The last uncounted village": 
The first Sony company Festival /the best film /Iran /2002.
Avanca Festival /the best film /Portugal /2003.
Busan Festival / Different cinema of Asia / South Korea / 2003.
Tehran short film Festival /the best film, A level / Iran / 2003.
D’ournise Festival / Kurdistan cinema /France / 2003.
Clermont – Ferrand /Elected by viewers /France /2003.
Aroca Festival / the best scenario (script) Portugal /2004.
Soleymanieh Festival /special prize by Jury /Iraq/2004.
Imago Festival /Elected by viewers/Portugal /2004.
Hamburg Festival /Francois O’dae Prize /Germany / 2004.
Torino Festival /Special Prize by Jury /Italy /2004.
Awards for "Black Horse Memories":
 20th Busan International Film Festival/ South Korea. 1 – 10 October/ 2015. 
 2nd Brisbane Asia Pacific Film Festival/ Australia. 19–29 November 2015.
 9th Asia Pacific Screen Awards, Brisbane/ Australia. 26 November/ 2015.
 15th !f Istanbul International Independent Film Festival/ Turkey/ 18–28 February/ 2016/"!f Inspired Competition" section 
 4th Duhok International Film Festival/ Kurdistan Region/ Iraq. 9–16 September/ 2016. 
Slemani International Film Festival/ Kurdistan Region, Iraq/ 1–4 October/ 2016 "Competition" 
Winner of: *Special Jury Prize*
 9th Kurdish Filmdays "Sercavan" Vienna, Austria/ 24 – 27 November/ 2016.

References

External links

 

1971 births
Iranian film directors
Living people